Mark Davis (born 6 August 1965) is an English former pornographic actor, director, and exotic dancer. In 1998, The Independent labeled him "Britain's biggest male porn star in America". In 2012, he announced his retirement from the adult industry. He has been inducted into the AVN and XRCO Halls of Fame.

Early life
Davis grew up in Essex. In 1981, his family moved to Toronto, Ontario.

Career

After graduating from high school, he went to Los Angeles to shoot a Playgirl pictorial at 18 years of age. Soon thereafter, he moved to the US permanently. From 1984 to 1988, he was employed as a stripper for the "Chippendale" dancers. In January 1993, Davis began his career in adult films.

In 2003, Davis was inducted into the AVN Hall of Fame. In February 2006, he was inducted into the XRCO Hall of Fame.

In his last years (2009-2012), he worked primarily for kink.com, serving villainous roles in BDSM scenes. In 2012, Mark Davis announced his retirement from pornography, ending a nearly 20-year career. In 2016, Davis returned to pornography to shoot exclusively for kink.com.

Davis performed in about 2,400 videos in his pornographic career.

Personal life
Davis was married to Kobe Tai and, later, Kitten. He served as best man for Jenna Jameson and Brad Armstrong's wedding in 1996. He was also a friend of Jon Dough, whose suicide affected him "big time."

Awards
 1994 XRCO Award – Best Anal Sex Scene (Butt Banged Bicycle Babes)
 1996 AVN Award – Best Group Sex Scene, Video (World Anal Sex Tour)
 1998 AVN Award – Best Anal Sex Scene, Video (Butt Banged Naughty Nurses)
 2001 XRCO Award – Best Male-Female Sex Scene (Welcome to Chloeville)
 2003 AVN Hall of Fame
 2006 XRCO Hall of Fame
 2009 AVN Award – Best Group Sex Scene (Anal Icon)

See also
 List of British pornographic actors

References

External links

 
 
 
 
 Adult Pornstar Mall Biography and filmography
 Podcast interview at Odeo

1965 births
Living people
English male pornographic film actors
People from Essex
English emigrants to Canada
English pornographic film directors